Sinners' Holiday is a 1930 American pre-Code all-talking crime drama  film starring Grant Withers and Evalyn Knapp, and featuring  James Cagney (in his film debut), Lucille La Verne, and Joan Blondell. It is based on the 1930 play Penny Arcade by Marie Baumer. Both Cagney and Blondell reprised the roles they played in the original Broadway production.

Plot
Ma Delano (Lucille La Verne) runs a penny arcade on an amusement pier at Coney Island with her children Jennie, Joe, and Harry (Evalyn Knapp, Ray Gallagher and James Cagney). Underneath La Verne's establishment, Mitch McKane (Warren Hymer) is running a bootleg operation. In order to escape detection, McKane doubles as a sideshow operator.

Angel Harrigan (Grant Withers), who works as a barker, is in love with Jennie. When McKane attempts to flirt with Jennie he is thwarted by Angel.

Harry secretly becomes involved in McKanes's bootlegging operation, against the wishes of his mother. When McKane gets picked up by the police on suspicion of bootlegging, Harry takes over his operations and pockets the proceeds. McKane is unexpectedly released from prison and discovers Harry's treachery. He encounters Harry on a darkened pier but Harry shoots him before he can act.

Harry confesses everything to his mother, but she attempts to place the blame on Angel, whom she does not like, by placing the murder weapon in his briefcase. As Angel is about to be taken away by the police, Jennie, who witnessed the crime and is in love with Angel, tells the police the truth, and her brother Harry confesses to the crime much to the chagrin of his mother.

Cast

 Grant Withers as Angel Harrigan
 Evalyn Knapp as Jennie Delano
 James Cagney as Harry Delano
 Lucille La Verne as Ma Delano (as Lucille LaVerne)
 Noel Madison as Buck Rogers
 Otto Hoffman as George
 Warren Hymer as Mitch McKane
 Ray Gallagher as Joe Delano
 Joan Blondell as Myrtle
 Hank Mann as Happy
 Purnell Pratt as Detective Sikes

Reception 
Time magazine felt that the story was credible and that it was refreshing to see a feature that was less than an hour long, with a concise story, as opposed to unnecessarily long hour-and-a-half features, which had recently been released.

Preservation status
The film survives complete; a print is preserved at the Library of Congress.

Home media
In 2015 Sinners' Holiday was released by Warner Archive on DVD.

References

External links
 
 
 
 

1930 films
1930 crime drama films
American crime drama films
American black-and-white films
American films based on plays
Films directed by John G. Adolfi
Warner Bros. films
1930s American films
1930s English-language films